WWE Vintage is a professional wrestling television program from WWE showcasing action from the extensive WWE video library. The show was hosted by Gene Okerlund and, later in its run, Renee Young. The current hosts is Scott Stanford and Megan Morant.

Vintage is shown in the United Kingdom and Ireland on Sky Sports (until 2014), in Australia on FOX8 (until mid-2013), in South Africa on SuperSport, in India, Bangladesh and Pakistan on Ten Sports, in the Middle East on ShowSports 4, in Latin America on Fox Sports and in Japan on J Sports. In early September 2012, Astro SuperSport 3 aired Vintage in Malaysia.

The show premiered in June 2008 as Vintage Collection, replacing Heat in the overseas markets in which it still aired. Each episode typically showcases 4 or 5 matches around a common theme (a particular wrestler, a major event, a division, etc.). Such themes can expand through 3 or 4 consecutive episodes.

Hosts

See also

List of current WWE programming

References

External links

2008 American television series debuts
2010s American television series
Television series by WWE